The Trade Union Act of 1913 was passed by the Liberal British Government under Prime Minister H. H. Asquith to remedy the situation caused by the 1909 Osborne Judgment, and gave unions the right to divide their subscriptions into a political and a social fund. If union members objected to these political contributions they could contract out of the payment.

References

United Kingdom labour law
United Kingdom Acts of Parliament 1913
Trade union legislation
1913 in labor relations
H. H. Asquith